The George Crady Bridge Fishing Pier is a Florida State Park, located on the Duval/Nassau county border of Amelia Island State Park, off A1A.  The park is named for George Crady, a local Florida state representative and supporter of the Florida State Park system.

Admission and Hours
There is a $2.00 per person entrance fee. Florida state parks are open between 8 a.m. and sundown every day of the year (including holidays).

External links
 George Crady Bridge Fishing Pier State Park at Florida State Parks

State parks of Florida
Parks in Nassau County, Florida
Parks in Duval County, Florida
Northside, Jacksonville
Amelia Island